Henk Visser is the name of:

Henk Visser (collector) (1923–2006), arms and armory collector from the Netherlands
Henk Visser (long jumper) (1932–2015), Olympic long jumper from the Netherlands
Henk Visser (pediatrician) (born 1930), pediatrician from the Netherlands
Henk Visser (politician) (born 1946), politician from the Netherlands